The Albanian–Venetian War of 1447–48 was waged between Venetian and Ottoman forces against the Albanians under George Kastrioti Skanderbeg. The war was the result of a dispute between the Republic and the Dukagjini family over the possession of the Dagnum fortress. Skanderbeg, then ally of the Dukagjini family, moved against several Venetian held towns along the Albanian coastline, in order to pressure the Venetians into restoring Dagnum. In response, the Republic sent a local force to relieve the besieged fortress of Dagnum, and urged the Ottoman Empire to send an expeditionary force into Albania. At that time the Ottomans were already besieging the fortress of Svetigrad, stretching Skanderbeg's efforts thin.

However, the League of Lezhë defeated both the Venetian forces and the Ottoman expedition. The League won over the Venetian forces on 23 July 1448 at the gates of Scutari, and over the Ottomans three weeks later, on 14 August 1448, at the Battle of Oronichea. The Republic was, thereafter, left with few soldiers to defend Venetian Albania. As a result, the League soon signed peace with the Republic of Venice, while continuing the war against the Ottoman Empire. After the Albanian–Venetian War of 1447–1448, Venice did not seriously challenge Skanderbeg or the League, allowing Skanderbeg to focus his campaigns against the Ottoman Empire.

Background 
In 1444, Skanderbeg had managed to unite the major Albanian princes under his leadership at the League of Lezhë, where a confederation of all the Albanian Principalities was created. Stresses within the alliance were felt, when Nicholas Dukagjini, a member of the Dukagjini family, a powerful family in northern Albania, ambushed and killed Lekë Zaharia Altisferi, prince of Dagnum and also League member. Since Zaharia had no children, he organized the killing to more easily gain Dagnum. The year in which Zaharia was killed is not recorded. A Venetian document dated to 4 January 1445, mentions Zaharia as the once lord of Dagnum which was given to Boxia, Zaharia's mother. The Venetian chronicler Stefano Magno says that Zaharia was killed close to the advent of the year 1445.

The two princes had been in dispute over who should marry Irene Dushmani, the only daughter of Lekë Dushmani, prince of Zadrima. In 1445, the Albanian princes had been invited to the wedding of Skanderbeg's younger sister, Mamica, who was being married to Muzaka Thopia. Irene entered the wedding and hostilities began. Dukagjini asked Irene to marry him, but Zaharia, who was drunk, saw this, and assaulted Dukagjini. Some princes attempted to stop the fight, but only more people became involved. Several people died or got injured before peace was established. Neither of the two antagonists had suffered any physical damage, but after the event Dukagjini was morally humiliated.

The death of Zaharia left his princedom with no successor. As a result, his mother handed the fortress over to Venetian Albania, a stretch of possessions of the Republic of Venice. Skanderbeg urged the Venetian legates that Dagnum (along with Sati, Gladri and Dushmani which had been taken by Venice) should be restored to the League since it guarded an important trade route, but Venice refused and, consequently, Skanderbeg prepared for war against the Republic itself.

The League soon sent envoys to its neighbors, Stefan I Crnojević and Đurađ Branković. Branković, a lord of Serbian Despotate, who was also in dispute with Venice over the Principality of Zeta, expressed his willingness to help Skanderbeg against the Republic but not against the Ottoman Empire. The Venetians sent an ambassador to Skanderbeg offering him 1,000 ducats to lay aside all claims to Dagnum in return that the Albanians would protect the country and keep the roads free from violence. Skanderbeg, however, refused to accept the offer and hostilities continued. Alongside the Spani family, the Dushmani family was against the war with Venice and did not participate in it.

Initial campaigns 

In December 1447, after leaving a protective force of three to four thousand men under Vrana Konti to guard the frontier in the event of an Ottoman incursion, Skanderbeg turned towards Dagnum with a force of 14,000 men. Initially offering the garrison at Dagnum the opportunity to surrender, he promptly besieged the fortress upon rejection. In order to pressure the Venetians, Skanderbeg also turned towards Durazzo, then another possession of Venetian Albania, and cut the city off from their local resources and trade. This move forced Venice to redirect to Durazzo two galleys, which initially were bound for Crete, in order to watch over the events there.

By then Venice treated Skanderbeg as a rebellious Ottoman vassal, so on 4 March 1448 a life pension of 100 gold ducats per month was offered to anyone who would assassinate Skanderbeg. In May, Ottoman forces besieged Svetigrad, putting great strain on Skanderbeg's campaigns. On 27 June 1448 Venice sent Andrea Venier, then provveditore at Scutari's Rozafa Castle, to attempt to persuade the Ottomans to invade Albania. After, Venice also sent Venier to meet with Skanderbeg in order to convince him to break off hostilities, and also attempted to push the Dukagjini clan away from their alliance with Skanderbeg. Despite measures taken by the Venetians, Skanderbeg marched towards Scutari unabated. He also dared the Venetians to send out a force to defeat him. The siege of Dagnum continued, however, with a force of 4,000 that Skanderbeg had left behind.

Battle of the River Drin 

On 23 July 1448 Skanderbeg crossed the Drin River with 10,000 men, meeting a Venetian force of 15,000 men under the command of Daniele Iurichi, governor of Scutari. Venetian forces were composed largely of local mercenaries, forming the center of Iurichi's line. They included forces under Koja and Andreas Humoj, Simeon Vulkata, Vasilije Ugrin, Zapa family (Jovan and his brother), Pedantari family (seven Pedantari brothers and many other), Moneta family (three sons of Rajko Moneta), Malonši family (Petar with his two sons), and Buša Sornja who were pronoiars. Iurichi positioned himself on the left wing with his Dalmatian forces, while the right was composed of Italian natives. Skanderbeg positioned himself and his personal bodyguard on the right wing, opposite Iurichi. The center of Skanderbeg's army was commanded by Tanush Thopia, and the right by Moses of Dibra.

Skanderbeg instructed his troops on what to expect and opened battle by ordering a force of archers to open fire on the Venetian line. Soon, the Albanian right wing advanced to engage first and managed to push the Venetian left wing back, while the center and the right engaged the Venetian center and left. The breakthrough was soon accomplished by attacking the gaps in the Venetian lines, causing disorder among their ranks. The battle continued for hours until large groups of Venetian troops began to flee. Skanderbeg, seeing his fleeing adversaries, ordered a full-scale offensive, routing the entire Venetian army. The Republic's soldiers were chased right to the gates of Scutari, and Venetian prisoners were thereafter paraded outside the fortress.

The Albanians managed to inflict 2,500 casualties on the Venetian force, capturing 1,000. Skanderbeg's army suffered 400 casualties, most on the right wing. The Venetian presence in Albania was weakened and the garrisons in the cities were stretched thin.

Skanderbeg retreated from the area to fight off an Ottoman invasion. Before leaving, he garrisoned the fort of Baleč (Balsha) near Dagnum, under the command of Marin Spani. Andrea Venier ordered the capture of Baleci after Skanderbeg had left, forcing Marin Spani to evacuate it. Venier then burned it to the ground. In retaliation, Hamza Kastrioti, one of Spani's colleagues, attacked a nearby Venetian fortress with what little men he had, but was defeated.

Battle of Oranik 

Despite the setbacks while he was away, Skanderbeg continued to focus on campaigning against the Venetian-requested Ottoman incursion at the Battle of Oranik in August 1448. The Ottoman expeditionary force was crushed on 14 August, with Ottoman commander Mustafa Pasha captured. The loss of Balsha to the Venetians, however, forced Skanderbeg to continue raiding Venetian territory.

Aftermath 
With Durazzo, Scutari, and Dagnum on the point of surrender and seeing a victorious Albanian army after the Battle of Oronichea, the Venetians sent Andrea Venier to open peace negotiations with the Albanians. The conference was held in Alessio and peace was signed by Skanderbeg and George Arianiti who represented the other princes on 4 October 1448. The signatories agreed that Venice would keep Dagnum. In return, the Venetians agreed that Skanderbeg would receive an annual pension of 1,400 ducats and an annual tax exemption for 200 horse loads of salt from Durazzo. An agreement was also made to establish trading privileges between Arianiti, Skanderbeg's ally, and Venice. Furthermore, a refuge in Venice would be offered in case Skanderbeg was driven out of Albania and two scarlet garments would be given to Skanderbeg in exchange for two altered falcons from the Albanian. However, threats were still exchanged between both sides and unofficial skirmishing continued.

Wary of Skanderbeg, Venice no longer openly challenged him. Another treaty was signed in 1463, when Venice went to war with the Turks. However, no peace was made between the Ottomans and Skanderbeg until 1463, before the Ottoman-Venetian war was of the same year, who retreated to Macedonia and prepared for another invasion of Albania after their defeat at Oronichea. During the Albanian-Venetian war, they had taken Svetigrad after several months of siege. Thence, they could cross into Albania uninhibited.

References

Sources 

 
 
 
 
 
 
 
 

Warfare by Skanderbeg
Wars involving the Republic of Venice
Wars involving the Ottoman Empire
Wars involving Albania
1447 in Europe
1448 in Europe
Conflicts in 1447
Conflicts in 1448
1447 in the Ottoman Empire
1448 in the Ottoman Empire
Venetian period in the history of Albania